Petrus "Piet" Römer (2 April 1928 – 17 January 2012) was a Dutch television, film and stage actor.

Filmography

Television series
Stiefbeen en Zoon (1963–1964) – Dirk Stiefbeen / Zoon stiefbeen
't Schaep Met De 5 Pooten (1969–1970) – Kootje de Beer / Zichzelf
Merijntje Gijzen (1973) – Flierefluiter
Baantjer (1995–2006) – de Cock

Feature films
De zaak M.P. (1960) – Douanier
The Silent Raid (1962) – Eppie Bultsma
Like Two Drops of Water (1963)
Amsterdam Affair (1968) – Detective
Business Is Business (1971) – Piet
Een huis in een schoen (1971) – Senor Piet
VD (1972) – Secretaris
Het Jaar van de Kreeft (1975) – Daan
Heb medelij, Jet! (1975) – Bodde
Peter en de vliegende autobus (1976) – Buschauffeur
De bende van Hiernaast (1980) – Piet
All Things Pass (1981) – Gerben
The Elevator (1983) – Beheerder
Mevrouw Ten Kate en het beest in de mens (1991)
Baantjer, de film: De Cock en de wraak zonder einde (1999) - Det. Juriaan 'Jurre' de Cock

References

External links

1928 births
2012 deaths
Dutch male television actors
Dutch male film actors
Dutch male stage actors
Dutch male musical theatre actors
Male actors from Amsterdam
Twin male actors
Dutch twins
20th-century Dutch male actors
21st-century Dutch male actors